Mohammed Marzoq Al-Kuwaykibi  (born December 2, 1994) is a Saudi professional footballer who plays a winger for Al-Ettifaq.

In May 2018 he was named in Saudi Arabia’s preliminary squad for the 2018 World Cup in Russia.

Career
Al-Kuwaykibi started his career at hometown club Al-Orobah and made his first-team debut during the 2012–13 season. He scored his first goal for Al-Orobah in the Crown Prince Cup match against Al-Tadamon on 4 October 2012. He scored his first league goal for the club on 9 November 2012 against Al-Hazem. On 27 April 2013, Al-Kuwaykibi was loaned out to Al-Entelaq who were participating in the Third Division promotion play-offs. On 8 August 2014, Al-Kuwaykibi made his Pro League debut for Al-Orobah against Al-Hilal. On 28 November 2015, Al-Kuwaykibi scored his first career hattrick in a 4–1 win against Al-Fayha.

On 14 June 2016, Al-Kuwaykibi signed a five-year contract with Pro League club Al-Ettifaq. He made his debut on 14 August 2016 in a 4–1 loss away to Al-Ahli. On 21 September 2016, Al-Kuwaykibi scored his first goal for Al-Ettifaq in a 2–1 win against Al-Batin. He ended his first season at the club scoring 5 goals in 27 appearances in all competitions. In his second season, Al-Kuwaykibi scored 5 goals in 26 appearances as he helped Al-Ettifaq finish fourth. On 31 January 2020, Al-Kuwaykibi renewed his contract with Al-Ettifaq until 2024.

Career statistics

Club

Honours
Al-Orobah
Saudi First Division: 2012–13

References

1994 births
Living people
People from Al-Jawf Province
Association football wingers
Saudi Arabian footballers
Saudi Arabia youth international footballers
Saudi Arabia international footballers
Al-Orobah FC players
Al-Entelaq SC players
Ettifaq FC players
Saudi First Division League players
Saudi Fourth Division players
Saudi Professional League players